Benjamin Nicholas John Lockrose (born 24 March 2000) is a New Zealand cricketer. He made his Twenty20 debut for Otago in the 2017–18 Super Smash on 28 December 2017. Prior to his Twenty20 debut, he was named in New Zealand's squad for the 2018 Under-19 Cricket World Cup.

He made his List A debut for Otago in the 2018–19 Ford Trophy on 18 November 2018. He made his first-class debut for Otago in the 2018–19 Plunket Shield season on 6 December 2018.

References

External links
 

2000 births
Living people
New Zealand cricketers
Cricketers from Portsmouth
Otago cricketers